Lester Persky (July 6, 1925 – December 16, 2001) was an American film, television, and theatre producer.

Early life and career
Born in Brooklyn, New York, Persky attended Brooklyn College before serving in the Merchant Navy during World War II. After the war, he worked at The New York Times and later as a copywriter at an advertising agency. Persky later opened his own successful ad agency.

In 1964, Andy Warhol used some of Persky's collection of old TV ads as part of Warhol's film Soap Opera (1964).

As a producer, Persky won a Primetime Emmy Award for his work on the miniseries A Woman Named Jackie. Persky also attempted to produce a miniseries based on the life of Howard Hughes with Terry Moore serving as a consultant.

Death
On December 16, 2001, Persky died of complications following heart surgery in Los Angeles.

Filmography

References

External links
 
 

Film producers from New York (state)
Television producers from New York City
American theatre managers and producers
United States Merchant Mariners of World War II
Brooklyn College alumni
Emmy Award winners
People from Brooklyn
1925 births
2001 deaths